Yorkshire Cup may refer to:

Yorkshire Cup (rugby union) ("T’owd tin pot"), a rugby union competition for Yorkshire clubs
Yorkshire Cup (horse race), a horse race held at York Racecourse
RFL Yorkshire Cup, a rugby league competition for Yorkshire clubs
BARLA Yorkshire Cup, a rugby league competition for amateur teams in Yorkshire